Drottningtorget is a common name for public squares in Swedish cities, the three best known being:

Drottningtorget, Gothenburg
Drottningtorget, Malmö
Drottningtorget, Linköping